Ibrahima Diédhiou (born 13 October 1994) is a Senegalese international footballer who plays AS Beauvais Oise as a defender.

Career
Diédhiou has played club football for Eupen. Diédhiou was released by Eupen after the 2016–17 season, and after one year without a club, he signed for fifth-tier French amateurs AS Beauvais Oise.

Diédhiou played for Senegal U-23 at the 2015 CAF U-23 Championship. He made his senior international debut for Senegal in a friendly against Colombia on 31 May 2014.

References

1994 births
Living people
Senegalese footballers
Senegal international footballers
Association football defenders
Belgian Pro League players
Championnat National 3 players
AS Beauvais Oise players
K.A.S. Eupen players
Senegalese expatriate footballers
Senegalese expatriate sportspeople in Belgium
Expatriate footballers in Belgium
2015 Africa U-23 Cup of Nations players
African Games gold medalists for Senegal
African Games medalists in football
Competitors at the 2015 African Games
Senegalese expatriate sportspeople in France